Gundula may refer to:
 Gudula, seventh-century saint in Brabant 
 Gundula Janowitz (b.1937) Austrian lyric soprano singer
 Gundula Krause (b.1966) German folk violinist 
 Gundula or Gundi Busch (1935–2014) German figure skater and coach
 House of Gundula, Gundulić or Gondola, prominent in Ragusa/Dubrovnik in the 13th-17th centuries
 Gundula Rapsch (1963–2011), German actress